(February 16, 1962 – May 24, 2002) was a Japanese actor and member of the Tokyo Sunshine Boys theatrical troupe. He was born on February 16, 1962, in Niigata, Japan.

Biography
He performed on stage, and on television in series such as Trick and Furuhata Ninzaburō. His trademark was his large, thick-rimmed glasses, which he used solely for comic effect, as he actually had 20/20 vision.

Ito joined the Tokyo Sunshine Boys in 1983, while he was a student. When he graduated from university he continued acting but took a full-time job as a standard salaryman until his career in acting picked up.

He was married in 2000 to a stylist that he met while filming the TV drama Shomuni, after dating her for less than six months. He died two years later, just before inclusion of the TV drama Shomuni FINAL. They had no children. He died on May 24, 2002, from a spinal cord infection caused by a subarachnoid hemorrhage.

Film

 1995 Salaryman Senka
 1996 Tomoko no Baai
 1997 Marutai no Onna
 1999 GTO

Television 

 1993 Furikaereba Yatsu ga Iru
 1994 Furuhata Ninzaburō
 1995 Oosama no Restaurant
 1996 Imaizumi Shintaro
 1996 Konna Watashi ni Dare ga Shita
 1997 Odoru Daisosasen
 1998 Shomuni
 1999 Omizu no Hanamichi
 2001 Gakko no Sensei
 2002 Nurseman
 2002 Trick 2

Selected theatre

 Nobody Else But You
 Vamp Show (Parco Produce)

Sources
 

People from Niigata (city)
20th-century Japanese male actors
Japanese male stage actors
1962 births
2002 deaths
21st-century Japanese male actors
Japanese male film actors
Deaths from subarachnoid hemorrhage